Never Gonna Dance Again is the third Korean studio album (fourth overall) by South Korean singer Taemin. It consists of two parts, Act 1 and Act 2, that were later collected together in the repackage album, Never Gonna Dance Again (Extended Ver.).

Background and release
It was initially reported that Taemin was preparing to make a comeback in July 2020. However, the comeback was delayed due to a wrist injury Taemin sustained while practicing choreography. On July 29, 2020, SM Entertainment confirmed that Taemin would soon be releasing his third full album, Never Gonna Dance Again, starting with the release of prologue single "2 Kids" on August 4, 2020. This was followed up by the release of the first half of the album, Never Gonna Dance Again: Act 1, on September 7, accompanied by title track "Criminal". The album features nine tracks, including "Criminal", "2 Kids" and a Korean version of the Japanese song "Famous", previously released by Taemin in 2019. Two remixes of "Criminal" by DJ Minit and Sumin were later released on September 29 as part of SM's iScreaM project.

The second half of the album, Never Gonna Dance Again: Act 2, was released on November 9, 2020, alongside lead single "Idea", which includes vocals by BoA. The album also features the song "Be Your Enemy", a duet with Wendy of Red Velvet. The two "acts" were later released together in an album repackage entitled Never Gonna Dance Again (Extended Ver.) on December 14, 2020, which includes all eighteen tracks.

Music and lyrics
The album featured Taemin's highest level of creative involvement to date. Taemin described it as "a moment of growth for me as an artist," saying, "I just really wanted to emphasize my individual talent and showcase my character as an artist, my own individual style." The album is intended to reflect a turning point in Taemin's career, and themes of identity and rebirth are central to the overarching narrative. Taemin envisioned the series as a "cinematic story," comparing the separate parts to a movie and its sequels that can stand alone but form a complete narrative when brought together.

According to Taemin, "Act 1 is about rebelling against the ordinary and the process of finding a new ego." Lead single "Criminal" is a synthwave song with newtro sounds and a Stockholm syndrome theme. "Black Rose" features rapper Kid Milli, and combines dark and colourful keyboard sounds with lyrics referencing a solar eclipse. "Strangers" is a dark pop song with an oriental melody. It describes the moment of meeting a past lover by chance and pretending to be strangers. "Waiting For" is a medium tempo dance track featuring a violin melody and Spanish guitar adlibs. "Famous" expresses the conflict between the artist's onstage and offstage persona. "Clockwork" is a pop ballad that recalls memories of a former lover by incorporating the ticking sound of a clock. "Just Me And You" is an R&B pop song with a retro tape source, whispering vocals and heavy drum beats. R&B song "Nemo" makes use of rhythmic guitars and evokes a 90s sensibility. The final song on the album is prologue single "2 Kids", and includes lyrics written by Taemin concerning painful memories of love as a child. It is described as an electropop song with warm guitar sounds, and is noted for showcasing a more emotional side to Taemin's vocals in contrast to his usual intense performance style. 

"Idea" is inspired by Plato's theory of forms and the allegory of the cave. Taemin described it thus: "instead of 'being trapped in a cave' and living in the shadow of the truth, I want to free myself from the darkness and embark on a journey of enlightenment where I discover a new ego, identity and meaning."

Track listing

Charts

Accolades

Release history

References

2020 albums
Taemin albums
SM Entertainment albums
IRiver albums
Albums produced by Steve Manovski